Bani Zeid al-Sharqiya is a Palestinian town in the northern West Bank, located north of Ramallah in the Ramallah and al-Bireh Governorate. It was formed as a result of a merger of the villages of 'Arura, Mazari al-Nubani, and Abwein, although the latter separated from the municipality.

History

Both Arura and Mazari al-Nubani were part of the Bani Zeid subdistrict in the Sanjak of Jerusalem. The two villages produced a combined 99 qintars of olive oil, the chief agricultural product of the Bani Zeid, and adult males in were taxed a combined 649 akçe.

'Arura

History
Pottery sherds from the  IA I, IA II, Persian, Hellenistic, Roman,  Byzantine and   Crusader/Ayyubid  eras have been found here.

Near, and within the village are three shrines dedicated to Sheikh Radwan, Sheikh Ahmad, and al-Khidr. Al-Khidr's shrine, in the center of the village, has no relation to al-Khidr, and his simply dedicated to a holy man with the same name. Al-Khidr or Saint George is revered throughout Palestine in several towns and villages. Sheikh Ahmad's shrine is to the west of 'Arura.

Not much is known about Radwan, except that his family was from Arsuf and he was an important man in the area that died in Egypt and was transferred to 'Arura for his burial. Muslim scholars suggested that Sheikh Radwan was from the 'Ulayl family. An Arabic inscription written in typical rural Ayyubid style, on the shrine's surface reads that he was transferred to "blessed Syria" (in early Islamic times, Palestine was a province of Syria). A mosque was constructed adjacent to the shrine.

Pottery sherds from the  Mamluk era have also been found here.

Ottoman era
In 1596 'Arura  appeared in the Ottoman tax registers as being in the Nahiya of Quds of the Liwa of Quds.  It had a population of 62  households, all Muslim, who paid a fixed tax rate of 33,3% on agricultural products, including on wheat, barley, olive trees, vineyards and fruit trees, goats and/or beehives; a total of 12,000  akçe. 1/6 of the revenue went to a Waqf.

In 1838 'Arurah was noted as a Muslim village, part of the Beni Zeid area, located north of Jerusalem.

Victor Guérin  visited the village in the late 19th century,  and found it to have about  350-400 inhabitants. He also observed fragments of columns and other indications of an ancient town. There were also threshing-floors which appeared  ancient.

Socin found from an official Ottoman village list from about 1870  that  Arura had a total of 91 houses and a population of 300, though the population count included men, only.

In 1882, the PEF's Survey of Western Palestine  described the village, called Arara, as being a small, on high ground, and remarkable for  having five sacred places on the west side of the village.

In 1896 the different parts of  Arura  was estimated to have about 237, 99 and  204 inhabitants; in all a population of 540 persons.

British Mandate era
In the 1922 census of Palestine conducted by the British Mandate authorities,  'Arura had a population of 426 Muslim, increasing in the   1931 census to 566 Muslim, in 131  houses.

The 1945 statistics found 660 Muslim inhabitants, with a  total land area of  10,978 dunams.  Of  this,  7,095  were used for plantations and irrigable land, 787 for cereals, while 26 dunams were classified as built-up areas.

Jordanian era
In the wake of the 1948 Arab–Israeli War, and after the 1949 Armistice Agreements, 'Arura  came under Jordanian rule.

In 1961, the population of 'Arura was  1,337.

Post 1967
Since the Six-Day War in 1967,  'Arura  has been under Israeli occupation.

There was a sharp decrease in the population from 1961 to 1982, caused by nearly half of 'Arura's inhabitants fleeing the village in the 1967 Six-Day War. In 1997, 'Arura had a population of 2,087, of which 30 residents (1.4%) were Palestinian refugees. The gender make-up was 1,069 males and 1,018 females. According to the Palestinian Central Bureau of Statistics, it had a population of approximately 2,967 in mid-year 2006.

Mazari al-Nubani

Mazari al-Nubani  , (Palestine grid 165/161) is situated along the same height as 'Arura.

History
Mazari al-Nubani was by  earlier scholars (Röhricht, Prawer and Benvenisti)  identified with the Crusader village called Mezera, but  newer  scholars (Finkelstein et al.) disputes this.

Ottoman era
In 1596 the village, under the name of Mazra'at al-'Abbas, appeared  in the Ottoman tax registers as being in the Nahiya of Quds of the Liwa of Quds.  It had a population of 60  households and 21 bachelors, all Muslim. Taxes were paid  on wheat, barley, olive trees, vineyards and fruit trees, goats and/or beehives; a total of 6,910  akçe. 1/3 of the revenue went to a Waqf.

In 1838 el-Mezari'a was noted as a Muslim village, part of the Beni Zeid area, located north of Jerusalem.

When Guérin passed by the village in 1870,  he estimated it had  a population of about 600.  An Ottoman village list from about the same year  showed Mazari with a population of 560, in 163 houses,  though the population count included men only. It was also noted it was located east of Qarawat Bani Zeid.

In 1882, the  PEF's Survey of Western Palestine  described the village, then called Mezrah, as being of moderate size, on high ground.

British Mandate era
In the 1922 census of Palestine conducted  by the British Mandate authorities,  Mazarie' al-Nubani had a population of 611 Muslims,   increasing in the 1931 census to 864 Muslims, in  193  houses.

The 1945 statistics found  1,090 Muslim inhabitants  with a total of 9,631 dunam of land.  Of  this,  7,399  were used for   plantations and irrigable land, 445  for cereals, while 59 dunams were classified as built-up areas.

Jordanian era
In the wake of the 1948 Arab–Israeli War, and after the 1949 Armistice Agreements, Mazari Nubani came under Jordanian rule.

In 1961, the population of Mazari al-Nubani was 1,358.

Post 1967
Since the Six-Day War in 1967, Mazari al-Nuban has been under  Israeli occupation.

According to the Palestinian Central Bureau of Statistics (PCBS), the town had a population of approximately 2,510 inhabitants in mid-year 2006.

Local government
The municipality was formed after a merger of 'Arura, Mazari al-Nubani, and Abwein prior to the Palestinian municipal elections in 2005. During the elections, Fatima Taher Sihweil from Abwein won and the municipality fell apart with only 'Arura and Mazari al-Nubani remaining.

The municipality separated in 2020.

References

Bibliography

External links
Welcome To 'Arura
 Welcome To Mazari' al-Nubani
Survey of Western Palestine, Map 14:  IAA, Wikimedia commons 

 
Towns in the West Bank
Ramallah and al-Bireh Governorate
Municipalities of the State of Palestine